Limbo refers to a fictional location in books published by DC Comics. Limbo first appeared in Ambush Bug #3 (August 1985) and was created by Keith Giffen.

History
In Ambush Bug #3, Jonni DC mentions removing Wonder Tot from DC continuity having "dumped her in Limbo". Ambush Bug later returns to Limbo in Son of Ambush Bug #6.

Animal Man

In Animal Man #25 (July 1990), Grant Morrison reintroduces Limbo, a dimension inhabited by old characters seemingly abandoned or forgotten by their publishers. The comic depicted such characters as the Inferior Five, Mr. Freeze, and the Gay Ghost (who expressed a desire not to be revived). This comic was published in the wake of DC's Crisis on Infinite Earths, in which many historic comics were removed from continuity. This "comic book limbo" is a metafiction, based on the notion that any character who has not been published recently can be said to reside in "comic book limbo".

Final Crisis

Limbo reappeared decades later in Final Crisis: Superman Beyond, also by Morrison, as the world on the edge of the multiverse past the Graveyard Universe of Earth-51. Merryman of the Inferior Five was still resident, and described himself as the "King of Limbo". In Superman Beyond, Limbo is shown to contain "the Library of Limbo", with only one book in it. That book was unreadable because it contains an infinite number of pages, all occupying the same space. Inhabitants of this Limbo include Merryman; various members of Hero Hotline; Walker Gabriel, the second Chronos (who seldom appeared after the end of his own miniseries); Hardhat, a villain who is the only surviving member of the Demolition Team after the OMAC Project crossover; and Ace the Bat-Hound, who disappeared after the events of No Man's Land, who is seen chasing Hoppy the Marvel Bunny. Also seen in the background is former Blood Pack member Nightblade. In both Animal Man and Superman Beyond, Limbo is shown to contain an archway bearing the inscription "Facilis Discenus Averno" ("the road to Hell is easy").

In the Reign in Hell miniseries, Limbo is referred to as closely adjoining Purgatory, one of the nine Infernal Provinces of Hell, but it is uncertain if the mythological Limbo is identical with "comic book limbo".

References

External links
 DCU Guide: Gay Ghost (Grim Ghost)
 Cosmic Teams: Inferior Five
 DCU Guide: Demolition Team

Fictional elements introduced in 1985
DC Comics dimensions